Robert Wainwright (1748 – 15 July 1782) was an English church organist and composer. He was the son of John Wainwright, whom he succeeded as organist at the Manchester Collegiate Church (later Manchester Cathedral) on his father's death in 1768. His daughter Harriet Wainwright also became a composer. After moving to Liverpool he became the organist at St Peter's on 1 March 1775. Wainwright composed church music and wrote an oratorio, The Fall of Egypt, first performed in Liverpool in 1780, as well as sonatas and concertos. His work has been described by musicologist Ronald Kidd as "competent and occasionally engaging ... although ... of little consequence".

References

                  

1748 births
1782 deaths
English composers
English organists
British male organists
18th-century composers
18th-century British male musicians
18th-century keyboardists
18th-century English musicians